Le Morne-Rouge is a commune and town in the French overseas department and island of Martinique.

Geography
Le Morne-Rouge is the wettest town of Martinique, It is situated on a plateau between Mount Pelée and the massive of the Carbet Mountains.

Climate

Le Morne-Rouge has a tropical rainforest climate (Köppen climate classification Af).

History
The commune was founded in 1888, following the division of Saint-Pierre.

Population

See also
Communes of Martinique

References

External links

Communes of Martinique
Populated places in Martinique